Nhim Sovannara (born 10 January 1990) is a former Cambodian footballer who last played for Nagaworld in the Cambodian League and the Cambodia national football team.

References

External links
 

1990 births
Living people
Cambodian footballers
Cambodia international footballers
Association football defenders
Nagaworld FC players
21st-century Cambodian people